Baantjer, de film: De Cock en de wraak zonder einde  is a 1999 Dutch TV crime film directed by Alain De Levita. It features the characters of the crime TV series Baantjer.

Cast
Piet Römer	... 	Det. Juriaan 'Jurre' de Cock
Victor Reinier	... 	Det. Dick Vledder
Marian Mudder	... 	Det. Vera Prins
Martin Schwab	... 	Det. Albert 'Appie Keizer
Serge-Henri Valcke	... 	Com. Corneel Buitendam
Hans Karsenbarg	... 	Dr. Ennaeus den Koninghe
Freek van Muiswinkel... 	Watchman Thijs Jochems

See also 
 Amsterdam Vice (2019 film also based on Baantjer's work)

External links 
 

Dutch crime drama films
1999 films
1990s Dutch-language films
Dutch television films